Mechanical Spin Phenomena is the debut studio album by the Danish industrial metal band Mnemic, released in 2003.

Critical reception

Laura Taylor of Exclaim! said that the album "has an aesthetic of accessibility (perhaps on the Fear Factory side) that may turn off some purists but gives the band a decent potential for reaching out to the masses."

Chris Clayton of Blabbermouth said that their debut "fully embraces every angle of aggressive music and, in an overpoweringly meticulous fashion, slots them all together seamlessly" and "could never quite be accused of being a one-dimensional recording."

Track listing

Credits
 Michael Bøgballe – vocals
 Mircea Gabriel Eftemie – guitar, keyboards
 Rune Stigart – guitar, keyboards
 Mikkel Larsen – bass guitar
 Brian Rasmussen – drums

References

2003 debut albums
Mnemic albums
Nuclear Blast albums
Albums produced by Tue Madsen